Ordinary Just Won't Do, is an album by American contemporary gospel music group Commissioned, released in 1989 on Light Records.

Domestically, the album peaked at number 4 on the US Billboard Top Gospel albums chart and number 28 on the Billboard Top Contemporary Christian chart.

Track listing
 "Back in the Saddle" – 4:40
 "Ordinary Just Won't Do" – 5:08
 "If My People" – 4:22
 "Heart of Mine" – 5:13
 "A Life That Shows" – 4:18
 "No More Loneliness" – 4:41
 "There's No Excuse" – 4:56
 "It Was You" – 3:50
 "Here I Am (More Than a Conqueror)" – 4:44
 "There's No Excuse (Reprise)" – 0:53

Personnel
Fred Hammond: vocals, bass, drum programming
Keith Staten: vocals
Mitchell Jones: vocals
Karl Reid: vocals
Michael Brooks: keyboards, drum programming, Synclavier
Michael Williams: drums, drum programming

Additional Musicians
Eric Brice: guitar
Parkes Stewart: background vocals
Brad Johnson: electric guitar
Randy Poole: Synclavier, Synclavier programming

References

Commissioned (gospel group) albums
1989 albums